This is a list of Canadian television-related events in 1957.

Notable events

Births

Television programs

Debuts
Front Page Challenge (1957-1995)
Bobino (1957-1985)

Programs on-air this year

CBC
Country Canada (1954-2007)
CBC News Magazine (1952-1981) 
The National (1954–present) 
The C.G.E. Show (1952-1959) 
Circle 8 Ranch (1955-1978)
Front Page Challenge (1957-1995)
Hockey Night in Canada (1952–present)
Maggie Muggins (1955–1962)
Open House (1952-1962)

Television stations

Debuts

Network affiliation changes

See also
1957 in Canada 
1957 in television

References

External links
CBC Directory of Television Series at Queen’s University (Archived March 4, 2016)